is a Japanese long-distance athlete competing mainly in the marathon.

Ogata was born in Kumano, Hiroshima. In August 2003 he came twelfth at the 2003 World Championships in Paris. In August 2005 he won a bronze medal at the 2005 World Championships in Helsinki. He then finished fifth at the 2007 World Championships.

Achievements

Personal bests
3000 metres - 8:01.86 min (2004)
5000 metres - 13:31.46 min (2003)
10,000 metres - 28:05.76 min (2004)
Half marathon - 1:01:50 hrs (2002)
Marathon - 2:08:37 hrs (2003)

References
 

1973 births
Living people
Japanese male long-distance runners
Japanese male marathon runners
People from Hiroshima Prefecture
Athletes (track and field) at the 2008 Summer Olympics
Olympic athletes of Japan
World Athletics Championships medalists
20th-century Japanese people
21st-century Japanese people